Jean-Yves Nau (28 May 1952 – 8 November 2020) was a French physician and scientific journalist.

Biography
Nau began his career as a schoolteacher before studying medicine and journalism. He began working for the newspaper Le Monde in 1980. He worked there for nearly 30 years, occasionally writing in La Revue du practicien, Revue Médicale Suisse, La Nouvelle République du Centre-Ouest. He moved to the French language version of Slate magazine as a columnist. He chaired the "journalism and public health" program at EHESP. He also ran a blog on journalism and public health.

Jean-Yves Nau died on 8 November 2020, at the age of 68.

Publications

Books
Journal de la vache folle (2001)
Bioéthique, avis de tempêtes : Les nouveaux enjeux de la maîtrise du vivant (2003)
Les Maladies d'aujourd'hui. De la maladie d'Alzheimer au sida (2003)
Tout ce que vous ne savez pas sur la chicha (2007)
Jean Bardet : faim de mots (2008)
H1 N1, journal d'une pandémie (2009)

Articles
"La véritable expérience du Dr James Lind" (2012)

References

1952 births
2020 deaths
20th-century French physicians
French journalists
French public health doctors